Scott Shearer (born 15 February 1981) is a Scottish former footballer.

Career

Albion Rovers
Born in Glasgow, Shearer began his career in Scotland with Albion Rovers. The staff at the club moved him on to amateur side Tower Hearts to get some game time and experience under his belt, as they felt he wasn't a good enough competitor to frequently break into the starting XI, despite making quite a few appearances in the first team before his move. After plenty of time at Tower Hearts, he was called back to Albion. During the remaining time he spent at the club, he went on to make dozens of appearances for the Scottish side, most notably scoring a last-minute equaliser at Hampden Park against Queen's Park.

Coventry City
Not long after his goalscoring heroics at Hampden Park, he was snapped up by Coventry City. During his first season as a Sky Blue, he consistently thawed into the starting squad, making 30 league appearances and gaining considerable amounts of playing experience. Mainly because of his call up to Scotland B, the secondary team of Scotland, although it was to be his only appearance to date for the side. However, the following season he lost his regular starting place to Luke Steele and played only eight times for Coventry, playing 13 times during two loan spells for Rushden & Diamonds F.C. His last game for Coventry was a 3–2 victory away from home at Vicarage Road, the home of Watford.

Loan at Rushden & Diamonds
Towards the final quarter of the season, Shearer was twice loaned out to Rushden & Diamonds. It was quite a short time overall with the club, put the duration of it was fruitful to Shearer as he played in the majority of the matches, accumulating a total of 13 appearances for the Diamonds.

Bristol Rovers
After returning to Coventry City from his double loan moves to Rushden & Diamonds, he was sold on a permanent basis to Bristol Rovers on 27 July 2005, in time for the 2005–06 season. Shearer was Bristol Rovers' first choice goalkeeper for 2005–06, making 44 League Two appearances. At the end of the season, he had racked up 144 league appearances for his clubs. However, after the signing of Steve Phillips, Shearer lost his place in the first team. Despite returning to the team in October 2006, playing three consecutive matches, he was told he would be dropped again, causing him and the club to possibly send him out if needed or look for an elsewhere club for Shearer. And it didn't take long for a call to come up.

Shrewsbury Town
On 25 October 2006, he teamed up with Shrewsbury Town on a three-month loan deal to provide cover for a facially injured Ryan Esson. During that time, he had impressed the staff, and by the time Esson had returned to full fitness, he had established himself in the first team, causing his loan deal to be extended until the end of the season. His last game for Shrewsbury would have been the League Two play-off final, had it not been against Bristol Rovers, whom he was ineligible to face due to them being his parent club.

Wycombe Wanderers
Back with Bristol Rovers after his emergency cover loan deal to Shrewsbury Town, he was purchased by Wycombe Wanderers, and he headed there with high expectations that were soon dampened just a few weeks in the new campaign. Only five games in, he had a freak training ground accident, in which he had a fracture-dislocation to his ankle and spent the remainder of the season on the sidelines, with Wycombe having to bring in loan goalkeepers Frank Fielding and Przemysław Kazimierczak to cover his and Jamie Young's absences. His second season was much more consistent, but a re occurrence of this injury meant he would sit on the sidelines. Despite this though, he was named in the PFA League Two Team of the Year for the 2008–09 season.

Wrexham
After Wycombe's relegation from Football League One, Shearer was released by the club. He was signed up by Wrexham. He made nine appearances for them before quickly moving on.

Crawley Town
At the end of December it was announced he would leave Wrexham and join Crawley Town on 1 January 2011. It proved to be a successful time with the club, making 41 league appearances.

Rotherham United
In May 2012, Shearer left newly back-to-back promoted Crawley Town to join his ex-manager Steve Evans at Rotherham United in the New York Stadium. The contention for the number one jersey at the club was tough, with three goalkeepers all competing to cement a starting place in Rotherham's starting lineup. However, Jamie Annerson would later be released by manager Steve Evans due to Shearer's arrival.

He made his first appearance for the club on 14 July 2012, where he kept a second half (Andy Warrington was played in the first) clean sheet in a 6–0 victory over local club Parkgate in the first friendly of pre-season. He appeared in most of the remaining friendlies too, thus sealing his place as the first choice goalkeeper at the club. Shearer made his professional Rotherham début on the opening day of the 2012–13 season. It finished with a compelling 3–0 scoreline in Rotherham United's favour, with Shearer keeping a clean sheet. It was not to be repeated three days later however, as he conceded two goals in a 2–1 defeat to Northampton Town at the Sixfields Stadium. Shearer continued to hold the jersey, despite letting in six goals in a 6–2 defeat to Port Vale, still very early into the season. Due to an operation, Shearer was out for six weeks, meaning there was a chance that he could lose his number one spot altogether to Andy Warrington.

He was released by Rotherham on 28 May 2014.

Crewe Alexandra
Shearer joined Crewe Alexandra on 3 July 2014.

Mansfield Town
Shearer joined Mansfield Town ahead of the 2015–16 season. He was released by Mansfield at the end of the 2016–17 season having made 53 appearances (46 in the league) in his two seasons at the club.

Oxford United
In May 2017 Shearer joined Oxford United of League One on a one-year contract, as cover for the first-choice keeper Simon Eastwood. He made his first-team debut at the start of October 2017 in an EFL Trophy Group 1 fixture against Brighton & Hove Albion U21s, a game which ended 2–2 (4–5 to Brighton after penalties). Before this game, first-choice keeper Eastwood had played 75 consecutive first-team fixtures. Shearer played in a second EFL Trophy fixture in January 2018, a 1–1 draw (won 3–0 on penalties) with Charlton Athletic in which he saved two penalties in the shootout. A renewal clause in his contract was taken up at the end of the 2017–18 season, committing the 37-year-old to a further year with the club. On 11 August 2018, after Simon Eastwood broke a finger during the warm-up, Shearer played his first and only league game for the club in a 2–0 defeat against Fleetwood Town. He returned to the club in a coaching capacity in July 2019.

Career statistics

Honours

Rotherham United
League One play-offs: 2013–14
League Two runner-up: 2012–13 

Individual
PFA Team of the Year: 2008–09 Football League Two

References

External links

1981 births
Footballers from Glasgow
Living people
Scottish footballers
Association football goalkeepers
Albion Rovers F.C. players
Coventry City F.C. players
Rushden & Diamonds F.C. players
Bristol Rovers F.C. players
Shrewsbury Town F.C. players
Wycombe Wanderers F.C. players
Wrexham A.F.C. players
Crawley Town F.C. players
Rotherham United F.C. players
Crewe Alexandra F.C. players
Mansfield Town F.C. players
Scottish Football League players
English Football League players
National League (English football) players
Scotland B international footballers
Oxford United F.C. players